The Treaty of Hamburg was signed on 22 May 1762 in the Free City of Hamburg between Sweden and Prussia during the Pomeranian War, a theater of the Seven Years' War. 

The treaty came into being after Russia had allied to Prussia on 5 May, making it impossible for Sweden to continue the war which they had entered to regain territories in Pomerania, which they had previously lost. The treaty reaffirmed the pre-war status quo.

See also
 Treaty of Hamburg (1638)
List of treaties

External links
Scan of the treaty at IEG Mainz
The Encyclopedia of World History (2001)

Treaties of the Seven Years' War
1762 treaties
Hamburg
Hamburg
History of Hamburg
1762 in Prussia
1762 in Sweden
Prussia–Sweden relations
Treaties of the Silesian Wars